Romansh (sometimes also spelled Romansch and Rumantsch) may refer to:
Romansh language, a Romance language of the Rhaeto-Romance group, spoken in southeastern Switzerland
Romansh people, people who speak this language

Language and nationality disambiguation pages